Art Watson (January 11, 1884 – May 9, 1950) nicknamed "Watty", was a catcher in Major League Baseball in 1914 and 1915.

Sources

Baseball players from Indiana
1884 births
1950 deaths
Brooklyn Tip-Tops players
Buffalo Blues players
Major League Baseball catchers
South Bend Greens players
Evansville River Rats players
Eau Claire Tigers players
Fond du Lac Cubs players
South Bend Bronchos players
Oshkosh Indians players
Madison Senators players
Grand Rapids Bill-eds players
Ridgway (minor league baseball) players